Red Elephant may refer to:

"Red Elephant", a music track on the 1995 self-titled album Sunny Day Real Estate 
The Red Elephant Foundation